Đurđevac is a town in the Koprivnica-Križevci County in Croatia.

History
Until 1918, Đurđevac (named Militär Sanct Georgen before 1850) was part of the Austrian monarchy (Kingdom of Croatia-Slavonia after the compromise of 1867), in the Croatian Military Frontier, under the WARASDIN-ST. GEORGENER Regiment N°VI. In the late 19th century and early 20th century, Đurđevac was a district capital in the Bjelovar-Križevci County of the Kingdom.

Economy

Population
According to the 2011 census, there are a total of 8,264 inhabitants in the municipality, in the following settlements:

 Budrovac, population 373
 Čepelovac, population 345
 Đurđevac, population 6,349
 Grkine, population 131
 Mičetinac, population 207
 Severovci, population 142
 Sirova Katalena, population 281
 Suha Katalena, population 337
 Sveta Ana, population 99

In the census of 2011, Croats formed an absolute majority at 94.92%.

The citizens of the town colloquially call themselves "Picoki".

Sights and events

 Old town Đurđevac
 Picokijada - Legenda o picokima
 Church of st. George in Đurđevac
 Sands of Đurđevac
 Park-Forest Đurđevac
 Seperacija, an artificial lake
 Čivićevac, the perennial river through the town

Notable people
Boris Braun - member of the notable Braun family, University professor and honorary Citizen of Đurđevac
Mladen Markač - Commander of Croatian Special Police during Operation Storm during the Croatian War of Independence (1991–1995), and afterwards held the rank of Colonel General

References

External links
 
 Awarded "EDEN - European Destinations of Excellence" non traditional tourist destination 2008

 
Populated places in Koprivnica-Križevci County
Cities and towns in Croatia
Bjelovar-Križevci County